Royal Kunia is a census-designated place (CDP) on the island of Oahu in the City & County of Honolulu, Hawaii, United States. As of the 2020 census,the population of the CDP was 14,896. The area was recorded as the Village Park CDP in prior censuses.

Geography
Royal Kunia is located just north of Waipahu at  (21.4052, -158.0318). It is bounded on the south by Interstate H-1 and on the west by Kunia Road (State Route 750).

Demographics

As of the census of 2010, there were 14,525 people, 4,014 households, and 3,524 families residing in the CDP. The racial makeup of the CDP was 12.5% White, 2.5% African American, 0% Native American, 51.7% Asian, 11.3% Pacific Islander, 0.7% from other races, and 21.7% from two or more races. Hispanic or Latino of any race were 9.5% of the population.

The median income for a household in the CDP was $103,649, and the median income for a family was $91,230. The per capita income for the CDP was $26,900.  About 4.8% of families and 2.6% of the population were below the poverty line, including 8% of those under age 18 and 4.3% of those age 65 or over.

Education
Hawaii Department of Education operates public schools. Kale'iopu'u Elementary School is in Royal Kunia CDP.

References

Census-designated places in Honolulu County, Hawaii
Populated places on Oahu